The Fürstenberg Brewery (German: Fürstlich Fürstenbergische Brauerei) is a brewery located in Donaueschingen, Germany. It has been a subsidiary of Brau Holding International since 2005, before which it was owned by the House of Fürstenberg, a German noble family. Among other offerings, the brewery produces pilsner, export, and wheat beer, primarily serving southern Germany.

History 
The counts (later princes) of the House of Fürstenberg first received a brewing right in 1283. The brewery began its transition into a large brewery in the 18th century, when Anton Egon, Prince of Fürstenberg-Heiligenberg began construction of a large brewery at the present-day site in Donaueschingen.

As the brewery grew, it began to export over the newly created railroads in Germany throughout the 19th century, making it an early adopter of long distance distribution. The brewery began to make pilsner-style beers in 1895. The brewery received a royal warrant of appointment from Wilhelm II, who designated Fürstenberg Pilsner as his table beverage.

Since 2005, the brand has been owned by Brau Holding International, a joint venture between Heineken and Schörghuber, with the intention of operating as an independent, wholly owned subsidiary.

Every year in late winter, the brewery produces a seasonal Fasnet beer for Swabian-Alemannic Fastnacht.

See also 
 List of oldest companies

References

External links 
 
 
 

1283 establishments in Europe
1280s establishments in Germany
Beer brands of Germany
Breweries in Germany
Breweries in Baden-Württemberg
Companies based in Baden-Württemberg